Barlozhnitsa is a small village in Slivnitsa Municipality, Sofia Province, located in western Bulgaria, approximately 12 km west of the town of Slivnitsa.

Villages in Sofia Province